Hapoel Bavli Tel Aviv was an Israeli football club based in Bavli neighborhood in Tel Aviv and was associated with Hapoel branch in Tel Aviv. The Club played for three seasons in Liga Gimel, then the fourth tier of the Israeli football league system, achieving its best position at the end of 1966–68 double season, when it finished fifth, and in the Israel State Cup, where the club reached the fourth round in 1966, where it lost 1–3 to Beitar Be'er Sheva.

References

Bavli Tel Aviv
Bavli
Hapoel Tel Aviv
Football clubs in Tel Aviv
Association football clubs established in 1964
Association football clubs disestablished in 1968
1964 establishments in Israel
1968 disestablishments in Israel